Chadipirala Adinarayana Reddy is an Indian politician. He was a Member of Legislative Assembly, representing Jammalamadugu (Assembly constituency) in  Andhra Pradesh. He won as MLA from Indian National Congress party in 2004 and 2009. Later he joined YSRCP and won as MLA in 2014. Later he moved from YSRCP to TDP and worked as Minister for Marketing & Warehousing, Animal husbandry, Dairy development, Fisheries and Cooperatives.  Presently he joined BJP and has been posted as vice president for BJP in Andhra Pradesh.

Chadipiralla's family has been active in politics since 1990. He has worked as chemistry lecturer in  B.A.R. junior college, Parlapadu. He has won as MLA on behalf of Indian National Congress 2 consecutive times from Jammalamadugu [2004-2014] and won as MLA on behalf of YSRCP party from Jammalamadugu [2014-2019].

In 2016, Nara Chandrababu Naidu Garu welcomed him into Telugu Desam Party and has given the responsibility of Kadapa MLC. He has played a key role in TDP's victory. TDP Party president has entrusted him with role of State Cabinet Minister for Marketing & Warehousing, Animal husbandry, Dairy development, Fisheries and Cooperative in 2017.

He has played a major role in TDP towards victory in Nandyal elections 2017.

He has contested as MP candidate from Kadapa parliamentary segment and lost in 2019.

Positions held:
2004-2009 MLA Jammalamadugu
2009-2014 MLA Jammalamadugu
2014-2019 MLA Jammalamadugu
2017-2019 Cabinet Minister for Marketing & Warehousing, Animal husbandry, Dairy development, Fisheries and Cooperative
2020 - Incumbent - Vice President - AP - BJP

References

Indian National Congress politicians from Andhra Pradesh
1958 births
Living people
Bharatiya Janata Party politicians from Andhra Pradesh